Ixora setchellii is a species of flowering plant in the family Rubiaceae. It is endemic to the Society Islands of French Polynesia.

References

External links
World Checklist of Rubiaceae

setchellii
Flora of French Polynesia
Least concern plants
Taxonomy articles created by Polbot